Vincent J. Candelora is an American businessman, lawyer, and politician. Candelora is the State Representative for the 86th House District and also serves as the Republican Minority Leader in the Connecticut House of Representatives.

Education 
In 1992, Candelora earned a BA degree from Connecticut College. In 1995, Candelora earned a JD degree from Pennsylvania State University Dickinson School of Law.

Career 
As a businessman, Candelora is the owner and manager of Connecticut Sportsplex. Candelora also works for Taconic Wire.

Candelora is an attorney with Susman, Duffy, and Segaloff.

Candelora's political career began as a council member of North Branford, Connecticut, where he served three terms.

In 2006, Candelora was elected to the legislature. 
On November 8, 2016, Candelora defeated Vincent Mase and won the General election. On November 6, 2018, Candelora defeated Vincent Made again and won the General election.

Candelora is a Republican member of the Connecticut State House of Representatives for District 86, serving his 7th term. Candelora's district includes the communities of Northford, North Guilford, Durham, and Wallingford.

Awards 
 2017 Connecticut Alliance of YMCA 2017's legislative champion. Given by Wallingford YMCA.
 2018 Charles Stetson Award. Given by Family Institute of Connecticut.

Personal life 
Candelora's wife is Carolyn. They have three children. Candelora resides in North Branford, Connecticut.

References

External links 
 bio of Candelora
 Vincent Candelora at ballotpedia.org
 Vincent Candelora at Votesmart.org

21st-century American politicians
Connecticut College alumni
Connecticut lawyers
Dickinson School of Law alumni
Living people
Republican Party members of the Connecticut House of Representatives
People from North Branford, Connecticut
Year of birth missing (living people)